Jan Wojciech Skalmowski (pseud. Maciej Broński, M. Broński, Piotr Meynert; 24 June 1933, in Poznań – 18 July 2008, in Brussels), was a Polish scholar, orientalist, essayist, writer, journalist and literary critic.

References

1933 births
2008 deaths
Polish male writers
People associated with the magazine "Kultura"